The 2004–2005 UCI Track Cycling World Cup Classics is a multi race tournament over a season of track cycling. The season ran from 5 November 2004 to 20 February 2005. The World Cup is organised by the UCI.

Results

Men

Women

References
Round 1, Moscow – Men's Results
Round 2, Los Angeles – Men's Results
Round 3, Manchester – Men's Results
Round 4, Sydney – Men's Results
Round 1, Moscow – Women's Results
Round 2, Los Angeles – Women's Results
Round 3, Manchester – Women's Results
Round 4, Sydney – Women's Results

World Cup Classics

UCI Track Cycling World Cup